Isfahan Shahid Beheshti International Airport  is an international airport serving the city of Isfahan, Iran.

Overview 
The airport is named in honor of Shahid Beheshti. For administrative and census purposes, it is considered a village in Qahab-e Shomali Rural District, in the Central District of Isfahan County, Isfahan Province, Iran. The airport has two terminals, one for domestic flights and one for international flights. Just adjacent to the airport is Khatami Air Base, which was built in the 1970s specifically to cater to Iran's fleet of F-14 Tomcats.

Airlines and destinations

Accidents and incidents
On 15 February 1965, Vickers Viscount EP-AHC of Iranian Airlines was damaged beyond economic repair when the port undercarriage collapsed as a result of a heavy landing.
On 18 November 2009, Iran Air Fokker 100 EP-CFO suffered an undercarriage malfunction on take-off. The aircraft was on a flight to Mehrabad Airport, Tehran when the undercarriage failed to retract. The aircraft landed at Isfahan but was substantially damaged when the left main gear collapsed.
On 15 January 2010, Iran Air Fokker 100 EP-IDA, operating Flight 223 was substantially damaged when the nose gear collapsed after landing.
On 24 January 2010, Taban Air Flight 6437, a Tupolev Tu-154M, crashed whilst making an emergency landing at Mashhad International Airport due to a medical emergency; all 157 and 13 crew survived the accident with 42 receiving minor injuries. The flight originated from Abadan the day before but had to overnight stop in Isfahan due to weather in Mashhad.

See also 
 List of the busiest airports in Iran

References

External links

Buildings and structures in Isfahan Province
Airports in Iran
Transportation in Isfahan Province